139 Tauri is a single, blue-white hued star in the zodiac constellation of Taurus. It is faintly visible to the naked eye with an apparent visual magnitude of 4.81. Because this star is located near the ecliptic, it is subject to occultations by the Moon. One such event was observed April 28, 1990.

This is a massive B-type lower-luminosity supergiant or bright giant star with a stellar classification of B1 Ib or B0.5 II, respectively. It is around 22.5 million years old with a high rate of spin, showing a projected rotational velocity of 140 km/s. J. D. Rosendhal (1973) identified weak emission features associated with an asymmetric H-alpha absorption line, providing evidence of mass loss. The star has about 10 times the mass of the Sun and around 20 times the Sun's radius. It is radiating over 80,000 times the Sun's luminosity from its photosphere at an effective temperature of around 24,660 K. Stars such as this with 10 or more solar masses are expected to end their life by exploding as a Type II supernova.

References

B-type bright giants
Emission-line stars
Taurus (constellation)
Durchmusterung objects
Tauri, 139
040111
028237
2084